Kalolophus speciosus, or Gibbs' clam, is a species of bivalve mollusc in the family Crassatellidae. It can be found along the Atlantic coast of North America, ranging from North Carolina to the West Indies.

References

Crassatellidae